1, 2, 3, Red Light, the second album by American bubblegum pop group the 1910 Fruitgum Company, was released six months after their debut album, Simon Says. The title song written by Sal Trimachi and Bobbi Trimachi, was the albums' only hit single for the band, peaking at #5 on the Billboard Hot 100, with both the album and the single just barely missing the success of their first release.

As with their previous album there has been questions about who played what. Original drummer Floyd Marcus has stated that he still played on the records even when a new drummer, Rusty Oppenheimer, was brought in. This does not seem to be the case for this album, as Oppenheimer receives a writing credit on the album but also does not perform on it as Marcus has explained that a number of session musicians were brought in to record new backing tracks for Mark Gutkowski to sing over while the band was out touring. This is supported by former Super K Productions staff writer and producer, Steve Dworkin, who, in an email to Unofficial 1910 Fruitgum Company Home Page creator Jonathan Gatarz, has listed the names of the session musicians.

Track listing

Personnel
 Mark Gutkowski – vocals
 Kenny Laguna – keyboards
 Steve Feldman – keyboards
 Jimmy Calvert – lead guitar
 Paul Nauman – rhythm guitar
 Norman Marzano – bass guitar
 Joe D'Andrea – drums

Chart positions
Album

Singles

Releases
Album
 BDS 5022 

Singles
 BDA 54 7" (July 1968)
 "1, 2, 3, Red Light" (Sal Trimachi/Bobbi Trimachi) – 1:55
 "Sticky, Sticky" (Jerry Kasenetz/Jeff Katz) – 2:05

References

1968 albums
1910 Fruitgum Company albums
Buddah Records albums
Albums produced by Super K Productions